Velika Loka is a village in the Municipality of Trebnje in eastern Slovenia. It lies on the Temenica River northwest of Trebnje, just off the old regional road leading to Ivančna Gorica. The area is part of the historical Lower Carniola region. The municipality is now included in the Southeast Slovenia Statistical Region.

The local church is dedicated to Saint James and belongs to the Parish of Šentlovrenc. It was first mentioned in written sources dating to 1581, but was greatly modified in the 18th century.

References

External links

Velika Loka at Geopedia

Populated places in the Municipality of Trebnje